Lua Vermelha (lit. Red Moon) is a Portuguese teen television series about vampires that aired on SIC. Produced in partnership with SP TV, Lua Vermelha premiered on January 31, 2010, airing on the weekends at 9:00 p.m. The series finale aired on May 27, 2012.

Synopsis
The Colégio Vale da Luz (Valley of Light Boarding School), a boarding school located in the middle of the Sintra Mountains, is a fierce institution known for its discipline and the way it shapes and prepares its students, several of which are in a peculiar or critical situation (either orphans, problematic teenagers or gifted ones), that for obvious reasons don't fit in the usual school system. It is there where Isabel, a 17-year-old girl who just lost her parents, will find friends and a mystical, mysterious and impossible love. When her parents died, Isabel was put under her uncles' care, but they only care for her money. On her first day at school, a very special boy will catch her eyes, maybe even too special.

Hanging out only with his "siblings", Afonso Azevedo is known, just like them, for being attractive, ethereal and untouchable. What no one knows is that Afonso and his "siblings", Beatriz and Henrique, hold a very old and dangerous secret: they are vampires. A typical Romeo and Juliet kind of story with a mystical and magic touch, that may just end with a happy ending.

Cast
Mafalda Luís de Castro as Isabel Oliveira
Rui Porto Nunes as Afonso Azevedo (186 years old)
António Camelier as Henrique Azevedo (83 years old)
Catarina Mago as Beatriz Azevedo (354 years old)
Anabela Teixeira as Francisca Azevedo (115 years old)
Afonso Araújo as Filipe Sousa
Diogo Costa Reis as Joel Soares
Henrique Carvalho as Hélio Raposo
Pedro Jervis as Gustavo Vilaverde
Cecília Henriques as Matilde Borges
Eva Barros as Joana Amarante
Laura Figueiredo as Laura Telles
Inês Aires Pereira as Luísa Ruas
Joana Oliveira as Rita Gouveia
Raimundo Cosme as Tiago Marques
Tiago Teotónio Pereira as Manuel (Manel) Zarco
Carla Lopes as Clara Mendonça
Sara Vicente as Maria do Céu Lage
Raquel André as Vânia Fraga
Rodolfo Venâncio as Edmundo Pestana (Ed)
Matilde Alçada as Daniela Lage
Alexandre Silva as Simão Paradela
Cristina Cunha as Magda Sousa
Ivo Alexandre as Abílio da Gampedangera
Joana Balaguer as Sofia Pinhão
Luís Vicente as Lúcio Cunha
Ronaldo Bonacchi as Guilherme Cardoso
Sofia Espírito Santo as Fátima Loureiro
Dimitry Bogomolov as Máximo (1,000 years old)
Carlos Pimenta as Rogério Nogueira
David Pereira Bastos as Samuel Garcia
Filipe Vargas as André
Paulo Oom as Raul Andrade
Guest stars
Diana Chaves as Carolina (94 years old)
Inês Castel-Branco as Helena Bathory (450 years old)
Merche Romero as Diana Amaral (51 years old)
Ricardo Pereira as Vasco Galvão (585 years old)
Virgílio Castelo as Jaguar
Tobias Monteiro as Xavier (over 100 years old)
Francisco Areosa as Duarte
Tomás Alves as Victor (186 years old)
Pedro Lacerda as Octávio Raposo (16 years old)
Diogo Morgado as Artur (915 years old)
Dânia Neto as Eva (138 years old)
Joana Seixas as Verónica
Vítor Gonçalves as Vladimir Polansky (760 years old)
João Manzarra as Mais Antigo (4,000 years old)
Sofia Nicholson as Daniela's mother
Igor Almeida

Filming location 
In Lua Vermelha, the characters meet in two main sets: The mountains and the boarding school.

Most of the vampire scenes take place in the Sintra Mountains. All of the wild and forest-like scenes are recorded there.

The outside of the Colégio Vale da Luz (Valley of Light Boarding School) was filmed in Cascais at the Palace of the Condes de Castro Guimarães (also known as the Tower of St. Sebastian), a 19th-century palace built in a small cove which stretches to the ocean.

The image sequences that appear sometimes were filmed in the Convento dos Capuchos and in the Sintra Mountains.

The inside of buildings (the school, the bar and the headquarters of Eternal Light) were all filmed in a studio.

Soundtrack
"Morte ao Sol" – Remake from GNR
"Lua Vermelha" – David Rossi e Ana Vieira
"Ai se ele cai" – Xutos e Pontapés
"Embora doa" – Klepht
"Balas de Prata" – Sebenta
"Tudo de Novo" – Klepht
"Cada dia que passa" – Tambor
"A vida dos outros" – Pluto
"Contos de Fadas de Sintra e Lisboa" – Os Pontos Negros
"Olhos de quem" – Sebenta
"Linhas Cruzadas" – Virgem Suta
"Apenas mais um dia" – Manga
"Sangue Oculto" – GNR
"Morfina" – Mundo Cão
"Ela era só mais uma" – Classificados

See also
Vampire film
List of vampire television series

External links
Official website 

2010 telenovelas
Portuguese telenovelas
2010 Portuguese television series debuts
2012 Portuguese television series endings
Sociedade Independente de Comunicação telenovelas
Vampires in television
2010s Portuguese television series
Portuguese-language telenovelas